Stanhopea lietzei is a species of orchid endemic to eastern and southern Brazil.

References

External links 

lietzei
Endemic orchids of Brazil